Bismar Gilberto Acosta Evans (born 19 December 1986) is a Costa Rican footballer who plays for Brann.

Club career
Acosta spent eight years in the Costa Rican league, most notably with Herediano. He moved abroad to join Norwegian side Start in January 2013, and then SK Brann in March 2015.

Career statistics

Club

International career
Acosta made his debut for Costa Rica in an October 2010 friendly match against Peru and has, as of January 2014, earned a total of 8 caps, scoring no goals. He has represented his country in 2 FIFA World Cup qualification matches.

References

External links
  - SK Brann
 
 
 

1986 births
Living people
People from Guanacaste Province
Association football defenders
Costa Rican men's footballers
Costa Rica international footballers
A.D. San Carlos footballers
C.S. Herediano footballers
Belén F.C. players
IK Start players
SK Brann players
Liga FPD players
Eliteserien players
Norwegian First Division players
Costa Rican expatriate footballers
Costa Rican expatriate sportspeople in Norway
Expatriate footballers in Norway